Dasaki Stadium is a multi-purpose stadium in Dasaki Achnas, Akrotiri and Dhekelia, Cyprus. It is used mostly for football matches and is the home ground of Ethnikos Achna FC. The stadium holds 5,422 people and was built in 1976.

Football venues in Cyprus
Multi-purpose stadiums in Cyprus
Buildings and structures in Gazimağusa District
Geography of Akrotiri and Dhekelia